Sixteen ships of the Royal Navy have borne the name HMS Viper, or HMS Vipere, after the members of the Viperidae family:

 was a 14-gun sloop launched in 1746. She was converted into a fireship in 1755 and renamed HMS Lightning. She was sold in 1762.
 was a 10-gun sloop launched in 1756. She was wrecked in the Gulf of Saint Lawrence in bad weather while escorting a convoy in 1779.
 was the Massachusetts privateer schooner Viper that  captured on 26 September 1776. She was purchased in 1777 and broken up in New York in 1779.
 was a 6-gun galley, the former South Carolina navy's Rutledge, captured on 4 November 1779 at Tybee and listed until 1785.
HMS Viper was a 14-gun cutter purchased in 1780 as Greyhound; in 1781 she was renamed Viper. She was sold in 1809.
 was a 4-gun xebec, formerly a French privateer. She was captured in 1793, but foundered in Hyères Bay later that year during the evacuation of Toulon.
 was a 16-gun brig-sloop, formerly a French privateer, which  captured in 1794. Vipere foundered in the estuary of the River Shannon on 2 January 1797 with the loss of her entire crew of 120 men.
 was a 4-gun Dutch hoy purchased in 1794 and broken up in 1802.
 was launched at Cowes in 1805 as the mercantile schooner Princess Charlotte. The Royal Navy purchased her in 1807. The 4-gun schooner disappeared in February 1809 while sailing from Cadiz to Gibraltar and was presumed to have foundered with all hands.
 was an 8-gun cutter launched in 1809 as the civilian vessel Niger. She was purchased that same year and sold in 1814.
 was a 10-gun gun-brig purchased in 1810. She was possibly renamed Mohawk later that year, and is not present on the navy list of 1811.
 was a 6-gun schooner launched in 1831 and broken up in 1851.
 was an  wooden-hulled screw gunvessel launched in 1854 and sold in 1862.
 was an iron armoured gunvessel launched in 1865. She was used for harbour service from 1890, as a tank vessel from 1901 and was sold in 1908.
 was a  launched in 1899 and wrecked in 1901.

Other vessels
HM Customs and Excise and the Bombay Marine, the naval arm of the East India Company, also had cutters or other vessels named Viper.

References
Citations

Bibliography

Grocott, Terence (1997) Shipwrecks of the revolutionary & Napoleonic eras (Chatham). 

Royal Navy ship names